The Mine is a Dubai based contemporary art gallery founded and directed by Sanaz Askari.

About 
Since its opening in November 2013, just as Dubai's win for the EXPO 2020 was announced, the space has been known to break down the city's commercial art scene by showcasing art that is accessible to art enthusiasts across the region. 
Known to exhibit artists whose works are often obscure and offbeat, ranging from bizarre sculptures to funky installations, The Mine has shaken up the local scene with a vast, ever changing collection of art that was otherwise overshadowed by more commercially successful artists.

The Mine is a warehouse made up of around six thousand square feet with two spacious floors. Every facet of the venue is unobtrusive, with waste items found around the industrial area molded into tables, chairs and reception desks. The space is also used as a platform where industry professionals can network.

Exhibited Artists 

Giovanni Leonardo Bassan
L'ATLAS
SUN7
TANC
Pez
Bahareh Navabi
Nazanin Pouyandeh 
Yasuaki Onishi
Francisco De Pajaro
L7M
Pose & Revok
Hamed Rashtian
Arash Nazari
Ivana Flores
Babak Dehkordi
Naeemeh Kazemi
Btoy
Frank&Robbert/Robbert&Frank

External links

References

2013 establishments in the United Arab Emirates
Art galleries established in 2013
Art museums and galleries in the United Arab Emirates
Contemporary art galleries
Culture in Dubai